The Salto Santiago Hydroelectric Power Plant is a dam and hydroelectric power plant on the Iguazu River near Santiago in Paraná, Brazil. It is the third dam upstream of the Iguazu Falls and was completed in 1979. The power station has a 1,420 MW capacity and is supplied with water by a rock-fill embankment dam.

It is owned and operated by Tractebel Energia.

Salto Santiago Dam

Power plant
The power plant at the southern end of the dam contains four  hydroelectric generators powered by Francis turbines. The remaining two penstocks are intended for future generators with a plant expansion. The first generator was commissioned on December 31, 1980, with another in 1981, two in 1982 the last of which was commissioned on September 16, 1982.

See also

List of power stations in Brazil

References

Energy infrastructure completed in 1980
Energy infrastructure completed in 1981
Energy infrastructure completed in 1982
Hydroelectric power stations in Paraná (state)
1980 establishments in Brazil
Dams in Paraná (state)
Dams on the Iguazu River
Dams completed in 1980
Rock-filled dams